The 2009 Golden Helmet (ZK) is the 2009 version of Golden Helmet organized by the Polish Motor Union (PZM). The Final took place on 30 April 2010 in Zielona Góra. The Golden Helmet was won by Janusz Kołodziej who beat Piotr Protasiewicz and Krzysztof Kasprzak. It was his second winning (after 2005 season).  Kołodziej also who the 2010 Golden Helmet host on September.

Like in 2008 Final, top three riders was automatically qualify for 2011 Speedway Grand Prix Qualification in 2010 season without Domestic Qualifications. Because Kołodziej (1st) and Grzegorz Zengota (4th) won the qualify in the Domestic Final, Adrian Miedziński (5th) was qualify also. Because all top five riders get the quality, Kasprzak (3rd) and Miedziński (5th) did not ride in the Run-Off heats and lost chance for the highest place.

Date controversy 
Original date of Final was October 10, 2009, but one day later in Zielona Góra was expected Speedway Ekstraliga Final. Main Commission of Speedway Sport (GKSŻ) decided about change date to October 2. 

However, the meeting was cancelled because the track was deemed unsafe (after the rain) by the Referee and was delayed to October 14. After that, GKSŻ, moved the Final' date to October 15. On this day, meeting was cancelled again, because the track was deemed unsafe (after the rain again). Because, the Ekstraliga Final at Zielona Góra, was delay 4 time, the GKSŻ decided about hosting the Golden Helmet Final in 2010 season.

In 2010 season, original date was March 27, but was moved to April 17, because the Zielona Góra stadium was remounted. But three days before the Final, GKSŻ decide about not hosting 2009 edition. One week later, GKSŻ change a decision and expected the Final' day to April 30.

Start list 
Original starting position draw

 Krzysztof Kasprzak (Unia Leszno SSA)
 Krzysztof Jabłoński (TŻ Start Gniezno)
 Tomasz Gollob (Stal Gorzów SA)
 Wiesław Jaguś (KST Unibax SA Toruń)
 Tomasz Gapiński (CKM Włókniarz SA Częstochowa)
 Grzegorz Walasek (ZKŻ SSA Zielona Góra)
 Jarosław Hampel (Unia Leszno SSA)
 Piotr Świst (KS Speedway Polonia Piła)
 Rune Holta (Stal Gorzów SA)
 Piotr Protasiewicz (ZKŻ SSA Zielona Góra)
 Sebastian Ułamek (Unia Tarnów ŻSSA)
 Stanisław Burza (KŻ Orzeł Łódź)
 Janusz Kołodziej (Unia Tarnów ŻSSA)
 Rafał Dobrucki (ZKŻ SSA Zielona Góra)
 Piotr Świderski (Unia Tarnów ŻSSA)
 Adrian Miedziński (KST Unibax SA Toruń)
 Daniel Jeleniewski (WTS SA Wrocław)
 Tomasz Jędrzejak (WTS SA Wrocław)
 Ronnie Jamroży (RKM Rybnik)
 Jacek Rempała (SKMŻ Lublin)

Changes:
Draw 3. Tomasz Gollob → Tomasz Gapiński
Draw 5. Tomasz Gapiński → Grzegorz Zengota
Draw 6. Grzegorz Walasek → Tomasz Jędrzejak
Draw 15. Piotr Świderski → Ronnie Jamroży
Emply:
Draw 9. Rune Holta
Draw 12. Stanisław Burza

Results 
 30 April 2010
 Zielona Góra
 Referee: Leszek Demski (Ostrów Wlkp.)

See also 
 2009 Individual Speedway Polish Championship

References 

Helmet A
Helmet A
Polish Golden Helmet